Lena or LENA may refer to:

Places
 Léna Department, a department of Houet Province in Burkina Faso
 Lena, Manitoba, an unincorporated community located in Killarney-Turtle Mountain municipality in Manitoba, Canada
 Lena, Norway, a village in Østre Toten municipality in Innlandet county, Norway
 Lena, Asturias, a municipality in the Principality of Asturias, Spain

Russia
 Lena, Russia, a list of names of several rural localities in Russia
 Lena (river), the easternmost of the three great rivers in Siberia
 Lena Cheeks, a stretch of the river Lena with peculiar rock formations in Kirensky District, Irkutsk Oblast, Russia
 Lena Pillars, a natural rock formation along the banks of the Lena River in far eastern Siberia
 Lena Plateau, a large plateau in Siberia
 Lena-Angara Plateau, a large plateau in Siberia

United States
 Lena, Illinois, a village in Stephenson County
 Lena, Indiana, an unincorporated community in Parke County
 Lena, Louisiana, an unincorporated community in Rapides Parish
 Lena, Mississippi, a town in Leake County
 Lena, Nebraska, an unincorporated community in Arthur County
 Lena, Ohio, an unincorporated community in Miami County
 Lena, Oregon, an unincorporated community in Morrow County
 Lena (town), Wisconsin, a town in Oconto County
 Lena, Wisconsin, a village in Oconto County
 Lena, South Carolina, an unincorporated community in Hampton County

People
 Lena (name), a female given name (includes a list of people and characters with the name)

Other uses
 Lena (test image), a standard test image used in digital image processing
 Lena massacre, in Russia 1912
 Battle of Lena, in Sweden in 1208
 Lena (song), a 1982 song by the Belgian band 2 Belgen. 
 Leading European Newspaper Alliance, set up by seven European newspapers in 2015 to improve journalism in Europe